The eastern yellow-billed hornbill (Tockus flavirostris), also known as the northern yellow-billed hornbill, is a species of hornbill in the family Bucerotidae. It is found in Djibouti, Eritrea, Ethiopia, Kenya, Somalia, South Sudan, Tanzania, and Uganda. It resembles the southern yellow-billed hornbill, but has blackish (not pinkish) skin around the eyes.

References

eastern yellow-billed hornbill
Birds of the Horn of Africa
eastern yellow-billed hornbill
Taxonomy articles created by Polbot